Spook crater is a small crater in the Descartes Highlands of the Moon visited by the astronauts of Apollo 16.  The name of the crater was formally adopted by the IAU in 1973.  Geology Station 2 is adjacent to Spook, between it and the smaller, younger crater called Buster to the north of it.

On April 21, 1972, the Apollo 16 Lunar Module Orion landed about 500 m east of Spook, which is between the prominent North Ray and South Ray craters.  The astronauts John Young and Charles Duke explored the area over the course of three EVAs using a Lunar Roving Vehicle, or rover.  They stopped at Spook during EVA 1, on the way back to the LM from Flag crater.

Spook crater is approximately 340 m in diameter and over 20 m deep.  Spook is about 550 m west of the landing site itself.

The Lunar Portable Magnetometer (LPM) was used to obtain a reading of approximately 180 γ (gamma) at Spook.  This was one of five locations at the landing site where the LPM was used.

Spook cuts into the Cayley Formation of Imbrian age.

Samples

The following samples were collected from the vicinity of Buster crater (Station 2), as listed in Table 6-II of the Apollo 16 Preliminary Science Report, which does not include samples smaller than 25 g weight (of which there were many).  Sample type, lithology, and descriptions are from the Lunar Sample Atlas of the Lunar and Planetary Institute.

External links
 Apollo 16 Traverses, NASA Lunar Photomap 78D2S2(25)

References

Apollo 16
Impact craters on the Moon